Fioravanti is an Italian automotive design studio in Moncalieri outside the city of Turin. The company began in 1987 as an architectural practice working on projects in Japan, and since 1991, it has focused its activities on automotive design.

Fioravanti was founded by C.E.O. Leonardo Fioravanti, who worked twenty-four years with Pininfarina on such vehicles as the Ferrari Daytona, Dino road cars, Ferrari 512 Berlinetta Boxer, the Ferrari 308 GTB, Ferrari 288 GTO and the Ferrari F40.

In more recent times the company has continued with independent creations, such as in 2004 with the Fioravanti Kite and collaborations with well-known car manufacturers such as in 2008 when the Piedmontese body shop designed the Ferrari SP1 for Ferrari. This model, made as a one-off, was the first car to come from Ferrari's "Special Projects" division, a program by Ferrari to create one-of-a-kind cars in collaboration with the most famous names in Italian design, for private clients. In 2006 the Fioravanti Skill was presented, based on the Fiat Grande Punto.

Cars styled by Fioravanti

Concept cars and one offs 
1994 Fioravanti Sensiva
1996 Fioravanti Nyce
1996 Fioravanti Flair
1998 Fioravanti F100
2000 Fioravanti F100r
2000 Fioravanti Tris
2001 Alfa Romeo Vola
2002 Fioravanti YAK
2004 Fioravanti Kyte
2005 Fioravanti Kandahar
2006 Fioravanti Skill
2007 Fioravanti Thalia
2008 Fioravanti Hidra
2008 Ferrari SP1
2009 Fioravanti LF1
2013 BAIC Concept 900

References

External links
 Official Fioravanti website
 Coachbuild.com Encyclopedia: Fioravanti

Coachbuilders of Italy
Green vehicles
Turin motor companies
Design companies established in 1987
Vehicle manufacturing companies established in 1987
Italian brands
Italian companies established in 1987